Bertrand Turnbull (19 April 1887–17 November 1943) was a Welsh field hockey player from Cardiff, who competed in the 1908 Summer Olympics. He also played first-class cricket for Gloucestershire in one match.

In 1908, he won a bronze medal as part of the Welsh hockey team that contested the medals with teams from England, Ireland and Scotland. He played as goalkeeper.

His only taste of first-class cricket came in 1911 when he appeared as wicketkeeper in a match for Gloucestershire against Cambridge University at Fenner's Cricket Ground, Cambridge. In a low-scoring match, he top-scored with an unbeaten 28 in Gloucestershire's first innings, but was out for seven in the second innings; he made one stumping. He also played Minor Counties cricket for Glamorgan.

He died in Canton, Cardiff on 17 November 1943.

References

External links
 
profile

1887 births
1943 deaths
Welsh male field hockey players
Olympic field hockey players of Great Britain
Field hockey players at the 1908 Summer Olympics
Olympic bronze medallists for Great Britain
Sportspeople from Cardiff
Olympic medalists in field hockey
Welsh Olympic medallists
Gloucestershire cricketers
Welsh cricketers
Medalists at the 1908 Summer Olympics
Glamorgan cricketers